BNS Nirmul is a  semi-stealth large patrol craft (LPC) of the Bangladesh Navy. She is the second ship of the class. She entered service with the Bangladesh Navy in 2013.

Design

The ship has a bulbous bow that suggests it is very stable in heavy sea states. It has speed and range to support long lasting missions. It has a complement of 60. This ship is able to perform limited anti-submarine warfare operations.

Armament
The LPC is armed with a single 76.2 mm H/PJ-26 naval gun and four C-704 surface-to-surface missiles (SSM) mounted aft. In addition, it has two dual Oerlikon 20 mm cannon mounted amidships which can be used in an anti-aircraft role. For use in anti-submarine warfare (ASW) it has two forward-mounted 6-tube EDS-25A 250 mm ASW rocket launchers and decoy launchers.

Electronics
The primary sensor of the ship is a SR-47AG air and surface search radar. It carries Type 348 Fire Control Radar for main gun. The ship has one X band JMA 3336 navigation radar. A JRCSS combat management system (CMS) with at least three multifunction consoles is also fitted in the ships.

Career
BNS Nirmul was launched in Wuchang Shipyard of China on 27 September 2012. She reached Bangladesh in February 2013. On 29 August 2013, she commissioned in Bangladesh Navy as BNS Nirmul.

On 12 May 2014 the ship left for Lebanon to join in United Nations Interim Force in Lebanon (UNIFIL). She replaced  there from 14 June 2014.

After completion of the UNIFIL deployment period, the ship visited the Port of Colombo from 7 to 9 February 2018 on her way back home. She also paid a goodwill visit to the Chennai Port of India from 14 February to 16 February 2018. On 18 February 2018, the ship reached its homeport Chittagong.

See also
 List of active ships of the Bangladesh Navy

References

 

Ships built in China
Durjoy-class LPC
2012 ships
Ships of the Bangladesh Navy
Patrol vessels of the Bangladesh Navy